Lille railway station or Lille station may refer to:

Lille-Europe station, the international and TGV station in Lille, France
Lille-Flandres station, the main railway station in Lille, France
Lille-Saint-Sauveur station, a former goods station that has been converted into an event and exhibition space